Bernauer Straße is a street of Berlin situated between the localities of Gesundbrunnen and Mitte, today both belonging to the Mitte borough. It runs from the Mauerpark at the corner of Prenzlauer Berg to the Nordbahnhof. The street's name refers to the town of Bernau bei Berlin, situated in Brandenburg.

When Berlin was a divided city, the Berlin Wall erected in 1961 ran along this street. Bernauer Straße became famous for escapes from windows of apartment blocks in the eastern part of the city, down to the street, which was in the West.  Several people died here when the border was first enforced.

History

Before the Berlin Wall

The Bernauer Straße existed early on as a commercial and military connection road between Berlin and locations in the Margraviate of Brandenburg.  It received its present name on 29 May 1862. Prior to this date, it was known as Straße 50, and later Straße 80, prior to being named Bernauer Straße. It led to the northeast from Bergstraße to the triangular intersection of Schwedter Straße and Oderberger Straße. On 4 July 1904 the southwestern extension between Bergstraße and Gartenstraße was completed. With the formation of Greater Berlin in 1920, and the related district division, house numbers 1-50, on the south side of the street, would lie in the district of Mitte, which would later be part of the Soviet sector of Berlin, and house numbers 51-121, on the north side of the street, would lie in the district of Wedding, which would later be part of the French sector of Berlin.  The road itself belonged entirely to Wedding, and later to the French sector; this would set the stage for escapes during the Berlin Wall era.

Berlin Wall Era

Since the street itself belonged to the French sector of West Berlin, the entrances and windows of the houses on the southern side were successively bricked up by the East German border guards and access to the roof was blocked. On 22 August 1961 Ida Siekmann became the first casualty at the Berlin Wall: she died after she jumped out of her window on the third floor (fourth floor by North American reckoning) at Bernauer Straße 48.

By autumn 1961, the last of these houses had been compulsorily emptied and the buildings themselves were demolished in 1963. There is a memorial tablet at the entrance to Swinemünder Straße dedicated to the ten people who are known to have died trying to escape in the area of Bernauer Straße.

The Bernauer Straße U-Bahn station, which served U-Bahn Line D, also suffered from the building of the Berlin Wall. Despite having an entrance onto Bernauer Straße which was located on the border of East and West Berlin, the station itself was located inside East Berlin and became a ghost station with all its entrances sealed off. The entrance from Bernauer Straße became part of the Wall.

Escape tunnels were also dug under the wall in Bernauer Straße. In 1962, one came out at Schönholzer Straße 7 (in the East). 29 East Berliners of all ages crept along the tunnel to West Berlin, unnoticed by the border guards. The NBC News documentary film The Tunnel was a visual account of that operation.

Another tunnel, probably the most famous of all, and later named Tunnel 57, ended at Strelitzer Straße 55 (also in the East) and, over two nights in October 1964, 57 East Germans managed to escape. However, the action was detected and ended with shots exchanged between the border guards and the tunnel diggers. Egon Schultz, a border guard, was killed and thereafter stylised by East German authorities as a martyr murdered on duty by western smugglers. The access to the files after the 1989 Wende revealed that he was killed in an exchange of fire and was hit by bullets from both friend and foe.

The street was also the first location of Rainer Hildebrandt's Mauermuseum before it moved to Haus am Checkpoint Charlie.

Fall of the Wall

After the Berlin Wall was first breached on 9 November 1989, work to create an opening through the wall where it ran across the road between Bernauer Straße and nearby Eberswalder Straße began the following day. The crossing officially opened at 8.00am the next day on 11 November 1989, making it one of the first of the new Berlin Wall border crossings created after the fall of the wall.

The Bernauer Straße U-Bahn station, which had become a ghost station when the Berlin Wall was erected in 1961, resumed operations on 12 April 1990. However, initially only the northern entrance onto Bernauer Straße was opened, while the other entrances which led to East Berlin remained closed until 1 July 1990. On that day, with customs and monetary union between East and West Germany, checkpoints between East and West Berlin were abolished.

The dismantling of this stretch of the Berlin Wall in 1989 was the first time that British soldiers (62 Transport and Movement Squadron, Royal Corps of Transport and Royal Engineers) based in the British Sector had worked directly with the former East German army. Heavy goods vehicles belonging to the transport squadron were provided to carry sections of the concrete wall away to an area near Potsdam.

The street has been rebuilt as a main road, with a tram line. However, few of the cleared plots on the south side have so far been built on again.

Memorial
After the Wall came down, Bernauer Straße was the location of one of the longer preserved sections. In 1999, part of it was turned into a memorial park, the Gedenkstätte Berliner Mauer, with a recreation of actual border fortifications. Germany's official 50th anniversary commemoration was held here on 13 August 2011.

Gallery

References

External links

 Norbert Nail: Images of the Berlin Wall 1962-1990 (in German)

Streets in Berlin
Berlin border crossings
Mitte